Hynek Štichauer (born 17 June 1987) is a former speedway rider from the Czech Republic.

Speedway career
He rode in the top tier of British Speedway riding for the Wolverhampton Wolves during the 2009 Elite League speedway season. In 2010, he finished third in the Czech national individual championship.

References 

1987 births
Living people
Czech speedway riders
Berwick Bandits riders
Glasgow Tigers riders
Plymouth Devils riders
Stoke Potters riders
Wolverhampton Wolves riders
Sportspeople from Pardubice